Cladenia is a monotypic moth genus of the family Erebidae. Its only species, Cladenia mocha, is found in Suriname. Both the genus and the species were first described by Heinrich Benno Möschler in 1880.

References

Calpinae
Monotypic moth genera